Koncert za brigadire (trans. Concert for the Brigadiers) is the seventh live album from Serbian rock Riblja Čorba, released in 2011.

The album features a recording of the band's performance on the 1985 youth work action Đerdap 1985. The album was released through RTV Stara Pazova, on CD, and, in a limited number of 1000 copies, on vinyl record.

Track listing

Personnel
Bora Đorđević - vocals
Vidoja Božinović - guitar
Nikola Čuturilo - guitar
Miša Aleksić - bass guitar
Miroslav Milatović - drums

Additional personnel
Vuk Popadić - design

References 

Koncert za brigadire at Discogs

External links 
Koncert za brigadire at Discogs

Riblja Čorba live albums
2011 live albums